Landmark Cases in Family Law (2011) is a book of chapters contributed by various authors, which outlines the key cases in English family law.

Content
The cases discussed are,

The Roos case (1670): Rebecca Probert, Associate Professor, University of Warwick. 
J v C and Another [1970] AC 668L: Nigel Lowe, Professor of Law, Cardiff University. 
Corbett v Corbett (Orse. Ashley)[1971] P 83: Stephen Gilmore, Senior Lecturer in Law, King's College London. 
Burns v Burns [1984] Ch 317.: John Mee, University College Cork. 
Szechter (Orse. Karsov) v Szechter [1971] P 286: Mary Hayes, Emeritus Professor, University of Sheffield. 
S v S; W v Official Solicitor [1972] AC 24: Andrew Bainham, Fellow of Christ's College, University of Cambridge. 
Poel v Poel [1970] 1 WLR 1469: Rachel Taylor, University of Oxford. 
Wachtel v Wachtel [1973] Fam 72: Gillian Douglas, Professor of Law, Cardiff University. 
Gillick v West Norfolk and Wisbech AHA [1986] AC 112: Jane Fortin, Professor of Law, University of Sussex. 
R v R [1992] 1 AC 599: Jonathan Herring, Fellow of Exeter College, University of Oxford. 
X (Minors) v Bedfordshire County Council etc [1995] 2 AC 633: Judith Masson, Professor of Socio-legal Studies, University of Bristol. 
White v White [2000] 1 AC 596: Elizabeth Cooke, Law Commissioner for England and Wales and Professor of Law, University of Reading. 
Fitzpatrick v Sterling Housing Association [2001] 1 AC 27: Lisa Glennon, Lecturer, Queen's University, Belfast.

See also
Landmark case
Restitution in English law
Landmark Cases in the Law of Restitution (2006) by Charles Mitchell and Paul Mitchell
Landmark Cases in the Law of Tort (2010) by Charles Mitchell and Paul Mitchell
Landmark Cases in Contract (2008) by Charles Mitchell and Paul Mitchell
Landmark Cases in Equity (2012) by Charles Mitchell and Paul Mitchell  
Landmark Cases in Land Law (2013) by Nigel Gravells

English law
2008 non-fiction books
Law books